This is a survey of the postage stamps and postal history of Eritrea.

Eritrea is a country in the North East of Africa. The capital is Asmara. It is bordered by Sudan in the west, Ethiopia in the south, and Djibouti in the southeast. The east and northeast of the country have an extensive coastline on the Red Sea, directly across from Saudi Arabia and Yemen. The Dahlak Archipelago and several of the Hanish Islands are part of Eritrea. Its size is just under  with an estimated population of 5 million.

First stamps

The first stamps of Eritrea were overprinted stamps of Italy issued on 1 January 1893. Before that, Egyptian stamps were used at Massawa between 1869 and 1885 and Italian post offices were established.

Italian Eritrea

The first stamps specifically for Eritrea were stamps inscribed COLONIA ERITREA issued in 1910.

Italian East Africa

Eritrea, Ethiopia and Italian Somaliland formed Italian East Africa on 1 June 1936. Stamps were issued on 7 February 1938 and until 1941.

British occupation

After British forces occupied Eritrea and the other Italian colonies during World War II, British postage stamps overprinted M.E.F. (Middle East Forces) were used. These were replaced by issues overprinted B.M.A. ERITREA or later B.A. ERITREA to reflect the change from British military to British civil administration. Stamps overprinted in this way were in use from 1942 to 1952.

1952-1991
Between 1952 and 1991, Eritrea was federated with Ethiopia and used the stamps of Ethiopia.

Independence
The first stamps of independent Eritrea were those issued to mark the independence referendum in 1993.

See also 
Postage stamps and postal history of Italian East Africa
British military post offices in Africa
Revenue stamps of Eritrea
List of people on stamps of Eritrea

References

Further reading
 Bianchi, Paolo. Colonia Eritrea: storia postale (1885-1903). Lugano: Edizioni arte e moneta, 1989, 210p.
 Cadioli, Beniamino. Poste e Comunicazioni della Colonia Eritrea: dall'insediamento in Assab all'occupazione di Massaua (1879-1885). Prato: Istituto di studi storici postali, 1995 , 136p.
 Carobene, Benito and Cesco Giannetto. Eritrea: interi postali annullamenti e loro valutazione. Milan: Centro Filatelico Internazionale, 1969, 79p.
 Saraceni, Gioacchino. Storia e filatelia dei possedimenti italiani del Mar Rosso e della Colonia Eritrea. Genoa: La Revista Filatelica d'Italia, 1928, 24p.
 Sirotti, Luigi and Nuccio Taroni. Le Occupazioni Britanniche Delle Colonie Italiane 1941-1950: storia postale = Postal History of the British Occupation of Italian Colonies 1941-1950. Rome: Sassone S.R.L., 2006, 363p.

External links

Postage Stamps of Italian Colonies by Tony Clayton
Eritrea: British Occupation (1943-1952) by Revenue Reverend
Eritrea: Ethiopian (1952-1991) and Independent (1991-present) by Revenue Reverend

Communications in Eritrea
Eritrea
History of Eritrea
Philately of Italy
Philately of Ethiopia